Tsoltim Ngima Shakabpa (born 7 September 1943 in Lhasa) is a Tibetan banker, activist, writer and poet, one of the first to write in English, composing poems in this language in 1967. Son of the Tibetan Finance Minister Tsepon W. D. Shakabpa, he left Tibet in 1950 to study at the extremely prestigious  St. Joseph's School, Darjeeling in India before working for the Tibetan government in exile and settle in the United States and was naturalized American.

Biography 

Tsoltim Ngima Shakabpa is the youngest son of the Minister of Finance of the Tibetan Government in 1939-1950 Tsepon W. D. Shakabpa. He was educated in Tibet which he left in 1950, then in India at St. Joseph's College in Darjeeling and the United States.

He works for the Tibetan government in exile in India as CEO of the Tibetan Industrial Rehabilitation Society founded in October 1965 by the Government of India, the Tibetan exile government and foreign aid agencies, and rehabilitates 7000 Tibetan refugees in agribusiness camps in Himachal Pradesh.

He moved to Cranford, New Jersey in the United States where he is a naturalized US citizen and lives with his American wife. There he became an international banker for the Republic National Bank of New York where he was assistant vice president based in Hong Kong before being appointed Senior Vice President in 1985, and then President at Corpus Christi, Texas until he was diagnosed with a stomach cancer in 1993. He struggles and regain health through meditation and Western medicine. According to his doctors, any trace of cancer was gone. However, he was struck again by a stroke in 1999.

Despite these setbacks, he became president of the Tibetan Association of Washington and founded the festival  TibetFest in Seattle in the state of Washington.

He continues to write poetry and in 2002 published his first book in Catalan, Records d'un Tibetà at Pagès Editors (University of Lleida), a Spanish publishing house, then in English in 2003. In April 2002, he received the chief editor award for his achievements in poetry from the International Library of Poetry. While adopting a healthy attitude towards life, he continues to fight for the independence of Tibet, questioning the Tibetan autonomy requested by the Tibetan government in exile in China, which can not offer freedom as great as that enjoyed by the Tibetan refugees in the world today.

In 2007, he gets a prize of Saint Joseph's College in Darjeeling.

In 2011, he is among the Tibetan poets who participate to 100 Thousand Poets for Change.

He has a son, Wangchuk D. Shakabpa, and a daughter, Pema Yudon Shakabpa, and lives with his wife in California.

Publications 
 Recollections of a Tibetan, avant-propos du Dalaï Lama, PublishAmerica, 2003, 
 Winds of Change: An Autobiography of a Tibetan, Paljor Publications, 2005
 Odds and Ends, 2006
 Voice of Tibet, préface Robert Barnett, Paljor Publications, 2006, 
 Dead People Talking, Paljor Publications, 2008
 I Imagine, 2009
 Being Tibetan 2010
 Voices of the Voiceless, 2011

References

External links 
 Molly Chatalic, Quand les morts parlent ... en anglais : révolte et survie dans la poésie de T.N. Shakabpa, Les Cahiers du CEIMA, Numéro 8, décembre 2012, p. 119-139.
 Tsoltim Ngima Shakabpa, Free Tibet--One Way or the Other, Los Angeles Times, 28 juillet 1996
 Tsoltim Ngima Shakabpa, The Case Against Autonomy for Tibet, WTN, 12 juillet 2007
 Tsoltim Ngima Shakabpa, Essay: The Role of English in Poetry by Tibetans, WTN, 10 juin 2008

1943 births
Living people
People from Lhasa
American bankers
Tibetan businesspeople
Tibetan poets
Tibetan writers
American people of Tibetan descent
People with acquired American citizenship